The Elbrus Race (or RedFox Elbrus Race), is an international skyrunning competition held for the first time in 2008. It runs each May at Mount Elbrus, Russia. which at 5,642 m is the highest mountain in Europe. The race has formed part of the Skyrunner World Series circuit four times.

Races
 Elbrus SkyRace, a SkyRace (7.36 km / 1,862 m), from 3,780 m up to 5,642 m MSL
 Elbrus SkyMarathon, a SkyMarathon (12 km / 3,342 m), from 2,350 m up to 5,642 m MSL
 Elbrus Vertical, a Vertical Kilometer (1,000 m), from 2,450 m up to 3,450 m MSL

Results

*record of the race

References

External links 
 Official web site
 Elbrusrace.com
 RedFox Elbrus Race at Laufcoaches.com

Skyrunning competitions
Skyrunner World Series
Athletics competitions in Russia
Sport in Kabardino-Balkaria
Vertical kilometer running competitions